Sejal is a name for girls in India meaning “pure”, “sacred water”. An allusion to the purifying nature of the Ganges and Yamuna river waters that are considered sacred in India and in the Indian religions. 

The word ‘jal’ on its own refers to holy water and is often added to Ganga (Ganges) in the noun Gangajal which specifically refers to the holy water from this river. 

The name is mainly used in the Indian state of Gujarat. Due to phonetic nature of the Indian languages, variations in spelling occur as follows:

• Sejal
• Sajel
• Sajal

Notable people:

 Sajal Barui (born c. 1977), Indian criminal
 Sajal K. Das, Indian-American scientist and engineer
 Sajal Nag, Indian historian

There are many examples of Pakistani people using Indian names with Sanskrit etymology and origin. 

Sajal Aly (born 1994), for example, is a Pakistani actress.